Chettalli is a small village near Siddapura, Kodagu in Karnataka state, India.

Post office
Chettalli has a post office and the pin code is 571248.
The telephone code of the village is 08276.

CHES, Chettalli
Indian Institute of Horticultural Research maintains a Central Horticultural Experiment Station (CHES) at Chettalli.  It is the largest facility of its kind in Asia and a lot of research work is being done here.
The station works on the madate crop of mandarin out of an area of 92 hectares in Coorg. The other crops of interest are papaya and passion fruit and minor fruits like rambutan, pummelo, avocado, mangosteen, karonda, Malayan apple and Garcinia. The station is also involved in the floricultural of rose, asters, gladiolus and orchids.

Coffee Research Station
Chettalli has one coffee research center concentrating on the cultivation and diseases of coffee.

Administration
Chettalli is administered as part of Somwarpet taluk in Kodagu district.

Tourism
Chettali attracts many visitors because of the undulating nature of the hills.

The altitude is 609 meters above sea level.

Cherala Bhagavathy Temple is also very popular.

Demographics
The people in Chettalli speak Kannada, Kodava and Tulu.

See also 
 Madikeri
 Mangalore
 Virajpet
 Somwarpet

References

Cities and towns in Kodagu district
Villages in Kodagu district